Contact is the eleventh studio album by the American vocal group The Pointer Sisters, released in 1985 by RCA Records.

History
Upon its release, Contact quickly became the Pointer Sisters' second-most successful album to date; it was certified platinum, denoting U.S. sales of over one million, and helped the trio win an American Music Award for "Favorite Video Group" in 1986. Contact yielded U.S. chart hits with the singles "Dare Me" (Hot 100 #11, UK #17), "Freedom" and "Twist My Arm." Another song, "Back in My Arms", was released as a single and video in the UK.

A track from the Contact sessions, entitled "Just a Little Closer", was released on the We Are the World charity compilation album in 1985.

Contact was remastered and issued on CD with bonus tracks in 2011 by Big Break Records.

Track listing

Personnel 

The Pointer Sisters
 Anita Pointer – lead vocals (1, 5, 9), backing vocals
 June Pointer – lead vocals (3, 6, 8), backing vocals
 Ruth Pointer – lead vocals (2, 4, 7), backing vocals

Musicians
 Andy Goldmark – synthesizers (1, 3), drum machine programming  (1, 3), arrangements (1, 3), acoustic piano (3)
 Bruce Roberts – synthesizers (1), drum machine programming (1, 3),  arrangements (1, 3)
 Paul Fox – additional synthesizers (1, 2, 4, 9), E-mu Emulator II (5, 8)
 Howie Rice – arrangements (1), additional synthesizers (1, 2, 4, 7, 9), guitar (1, 3, 8), synthesizers (3, 6, 8), handclaps (3), drum machine programming (8, 9), Minimoog (9)
 Steve George – keyboards (2, 4, 5), synthesizers (2, 4), arrangements (2, 4, 5), synth bass (5)
 Steve Mitchell – additional synthesizers (2, 7), Hammond B3 organ (3, 5), handclaps (3), Oberheim DMX programming (6), synthesizers (8), drum machine programming (8)
 Jeff Lorber – synth bass (3),  synthesizers (9), guitar (9), drum machine programming (9)
 Mark Goldenberg – acoustic piano (6), synthesizers (6), guitar (6), drum machine programming (6), arrangements (6)
 Tommy Faragher – keyboards (7), synthesizers (7)
 Steve Farris – guitar (2)
 Michael Landau – guitar (4)
 Robbie Nevil – guitar (7), drum machine programming (7), arrangements (7)
 Peter Rafelson – guitar (8)
 Nathan East – bass (1, 2)
 Neil Stubenhaus – bass (4)
 Jennifer Condos – bass (6)
 Welton Gite – bass (8)
 Pat Mastelotto – drum machine programming (2, 4, 5), drums (4, 5)
 Harry Stinson – drum machine programming (6)
 Brock Walsh – drum machine programming (7), arrangements (7)
 Paulinho da Costa – percussion (1, 4-9)
 Terral "Terry" Santiel – percussion (1, 3, 5, 6)
 Debra Dobkin – percussion (6)
 Larry Williams – saxophone (5)
 Phil Kenzie – saxophone (6)
 Bill Reichenbach Jr. – trombone (5)
 Gary Grant – trumpet (5)
 Jerry Hey – trumpet (5), horn arrangements (5)
 Paul Buckmaster – string arrangements and conductor (2, 4)
 Richard Page – arrangements (2, 4, 5)

Production
 Producer – Richard Perry
 Associate producers – Andy Goldmark (tracks 1 & 3); Howie Rice (track 1); Bruce Roberts (tracks 1 & 3); Steve George (tracks 2 & 4); Richard Page (tracks 2, 4 & 5); Mark Goldenberg (track 6); Robbie Nevil (track 7); Brock Walsh (track 7).
 Production manager – James C. Tract
 Production coordinator – Bradford Rosenberg
 Recording engineer – Michael Brooks
 Additional engineers – Clif Jones, Glen Holguin, Alex Schmoll, Gary Skardina and Don Smith.
 Assistant engineers – David Dubow, Glen Holguin, Julie Last, Ray Leonard, Bob Loftus, Kraig Miller, Alex Schmoll and Delilah Seroussi.
 Basic track engineering – Paul Rey (track 2); Ian Eales (tracks 4 & 5); Ernie Sheesley (track 7).
 Remix engineer – Don Smith
 Mastered by Stephen Marcussen at Precision Mastering (Hollywood, CA).
 Art direction and design by John Kosh and Ron Larson
 Photography by Randee St. Nicholas

Charts

References

External links
 

1985 albums
The Pointer Sisters albums
Albums produced by Richard Perry
RCA Records albums